BattleTroops is a FASA wargame set in the BattleTech universe, simulating infantry combat. It was expanded to include Clan Elementals with ClanTroops.  It was published in 1989.

External links
 

BattleTech games
Board games introduced in 1989
Science fiction board wargames